In type theory, bounded quantification (also bounded polymorphism or constrained genericity) refers to universal or existential quantifiers which are restricted ("bounded") to range only over the subtypes of a particular type. Bounded quantification is an interaction of parametric polymorphism with subtyping. Bounded quantification has traditionally been studied in the functional setting of System F<:, but is available in modern object-oriented languages supporting parametric polymorphism (generics) such as Java, C# and Scala.

Overview 
The purpose of bounded quantification is to allow for polymorphic functions to depend on some specific behaviour of objects instead of type inheritance. It assumes a record-based model for object classes, where every class member is a record element and all class members are named functions. Object attributes are represented as functions that take no argument and return an object. The specific behaviour is then some function name along with the types of the arguments and the return type. Bounded quantification considers all objects with such a function. An example would be a polymorphic min function that considers all objects that are comparable to each other.

F-bounded quantification 
F-bounded quantification or recursively bounded quantification, introduced in 1989, allows for more precise typing of functions that are applied on recursive types. A recursive type is one that includes a function that uses it as a type for some argument or its return value.

Example 
This kind of type constraint can be expressed in Java with a generic interface. The following example demonstrates how to describe types that can be compared to each other and use this as typing information in polymorphic functions. The Test.min function uses simple bounded quantification and does not preserve the type of the assigned types, in contrast with the Test.Fmin function which uses F-bounded quantification.

In mathematical notation, the types of the two functions are

min: ∀ T, ∀ S ⊆ {compareTo: T → int}. S → S → S
Fmin: ∀ T ⊆ Comparable[T]. T → T → T

where

Comparable[T] = {compareTo: T → int}

interface Comparable<T> {
    public int compareTo(T other);
}

class Integer implements Comparable<Integer> {
    @Override
    public int compareTo(Integer other) {
        // ...
    }
}

class String implements Comparable<String> {
    @Override
    public int compareTo(String other) {
        // ...
    }
}

class Test {
    public static void main(String[] args) {
        Comparable<String> a = min("cat", "dog");
        Comparable<Integer> b = min(new Integer(10), new Integer(3));
        String str = Fmin("cat", "dog");
        Integer i = Fmin(new Integer(10), new Integer(3));
    }
    public static <S extends Comparable> S min(S a, S b) {
        if (a.compareTo(b) <= 0)
            return a;
        else
            return b;
    }
    public static <T extends Comparable<T>> T Fmin(T a, T b) {
        if (a.compareTo(b) <= 0)
            return a;
        else
            return b;
    }
}

See also 
 Covariance and contravariance (computer science)
 Curiously recurring template pattern
 Wildcard (Java)

Notes

References 
 
 Peter S. Canning, William R. Cook, Walter L. Hill, John C. Mitchell, and William Olthoff. "F-bounded polymorphism for object-oriented programming". In Conference on Functional Programming Languages and Computer Architecture, 1989.
 Benjamin C. Pierce "Intersection types and bounded polymorphism". Lecture Notes in Computer Science 664, 1993.
 Gilad Bracha, Martin Odersky, David Stoutamire, and Philip Wadler. "Making the future safe for the past: Adding genericity to the Java programming language". In Object-Oriented Programming: Systems, Languages, Applications (OOPSLA). ACM, October 1998.
 Andrew Kennedy and Don Syme. "Design and Implementation of Generics for the .NET Common Language Runtime". In Programming Language Design and Implementation, 2001.
 , Chapter 26: Bounded quantification

External links 
 Bounded Polymorphism at the Portland Pattern Repository
 "F-bounded Polymorphism" in The Cecil Language: Specification and Rationale

Polymorphism (computer science)
Object-oriented programming
Type theory
Articles with example Java code